Justin Donald Ricketts (born 8 November 1973) is an English former first-class cricketer.

Ricketts was born at Salisbury in November 1973. He was educated at Sherborne School, before going up to Balliol College, Oxford. While studying at Oxford, he played first-class cricket for Oxford University in 1995, making ten appearances, one of which was The University Match against Cambridge at Lord's. In his ten matches, Ricketts scored a total of 148 run at an average of 14.80 and a high score of 63. With his leg break googly bowling, he took 17 wickets at a bowling average of 43.05 and best figures of 3 for 30. Ricketts later emigrated to Australia, where he is involved in business.

References

External links

1973 births
Living people
People from Salisbury
People educated at Sherborne School
Alumni of Balliol College, Oxford
English cricketers
Oxford University cricketers
English businesspeople
English emigrants to Australia